Central Armagh was a constituency of the Parliament of Northern Ireland.

Boundaries
Central Armagh was a county constituency comprising the north central part of County Armagh. It was created when the House of Commons (Method of Voting and Redistribution of Seats) Act (Northern Ireland) 1929 introduced first-past-the-post elections throughout Northern Ireland. Central Armagh was created by the division of Armagh into four new constituencies. The constituency survived unchanged, returning one member of Parliament, until the Parliament of Northern Ireland was temporarily suspended in 1972, and then formally abolished in 1973.

The seat was centred on the towns of Portadown and Tandragee and included parts of the rural districts of Armagh, Lurgan and Tandragee.

Politics 
The seat was always won by Ulster Unionist Party candidates.  It was twice contested by labour movement candidates, who took around one third of the votes cast.

Members of Parliament

Election results 

At the 1929, 1933 and 1938 Northern Ireland general elections, David Shillington was elected unopposed.

At the 1941 by-election, George Dougan was elected unopposed.

At the 1949, and 1953 Northern Ireland general elections, George Dougan was elected unopposed.

At the 1955 by-election and the 1958 Northern Ireland general election, Isaac Hawthorne was elected unopposed.

At 1965 Northern Ireland general election, Isaac Hawthorne was elected unopposed.

At 1969 Northern Ireland general election, Herbert Whitten was elected unopposed.

References

Historic constituencies in County Armagh
Northern Ireland Parliament constituencies established in 1929
Constituencies of the Northern Ireland Parliament
Northern Ireland Parliament constituencies disestablished in 1973